Amanda Kay Levens (born January 24, 1979) is an American women's college basketball coach. She is currently the head coach at the University of Nevada. Previously, she was hired as head coach at Southern Illinois University Edwardsville (SIUE) in 2008, when the school began a five-year transition to the NCAA's Division I. From 2012 to 2017, she was associate head coach at Arizona State before being hired at Nevada as head coach.

Early life and education
Born in Belvidere, Illinois, Levens graduated from Belvidere High School in 1997. At Belvidere High, she was a three-time All State and Amateur Athletic Union All-American honoree in basketball.

In the fall of 1997, Levens enrolled at Old Dominion University and began playing at point guard for the Old Dominion Monarchs. In her first season in 1997–98, Levens played in 29 games and averaged 3.1 points as Old Dominion made a run to the Sweet 16 round of the 1998 NCAA tournament. Then in 1998–99, Levens started 23 of 32 games, averaging 21.0 minutes and 6.7 points. Old Dominion made a second straight Sweet 16 appearance in the 1999 NCAA Tournament.

After two seasons at Old Dominion, Levens transferred to Arizona State University, where she was a star member of the Sun Devils. At Arizona State, she broke the school's season records for most three-point shots made, with 60 in 2001 and free throws, with 167 in 2002. In her Arizona State career, Levens scored 1,020  points, an average of 15.9 points per game; dished out 240 assists, a 3.8 per game average; and recovered 218 rebounds for 3.4 per game. In both seasons at ASU, she was a member of the All Pac-10 First Team, and she received an honorable mention on the 2002 Associated Press All-America Team. After graduating from Arizona State with a bachelor's degree in history, Levens signed a free agent contract with the Charlotte Sting of the Women's National Basketball Association, but she was released before the regular season began.
In 2007 she earned her master's degree in educational leadership from Nevada.

College playing statistics

Source

Coaching career

Nevada assistant (2003–2008)

From 2003 to 2008, Levens was an assistant coach for the women's basketball program headed by Kim Gervasoni at the University of Nevada.

SIU Edwardsville (2008–2012)

In April 2008, she was selected as the fourth head coach of the SIU Edwardsville Cougars.
SIUE joined the Ohio Valley Conference (OVC) in 2008 and played its first full conference schedule in the 2011–12 season. Prior to that first season, Leven's Cougars were picked by the league's coaches to finish eighth of the eleven teams. After SIUE finished the season in third place, with a conference record of 12 wins and 4 losses, Levens was named the 2012 Ohio Valley Conference Women's Basketball Coach of the Year. Although the Cougars would not be eligible for OVC or NCAA post-season competition until the 2012–13 season, they were invited to play in the 2012 Women's Basketball Invitational (WBI) tournament.

Arizona State assistant (2012–2017)
On April 20, 2012, Levens returned to Arizona State as associate head coach under Charli Turner Thorne. During her five-year tenure as the top assistant, Arizona State appeared in the Sweet 16 of the 2015 NCAA tournament and won the 2015–16 Pac-12 Conference regular season title.

Nevada (2017–present)
On March 31, 2017, Levens returned to Nevada to be head coach, following the retirement of Jane Albright.

Inheriting a team that finished 11–19 the previous season, Levens led Nevada to a 19–17 record and appearance in the 2018 Women's Basketball Invitational semifinals. The 19 wins were the most for any Nevada first-year head coach in program history. However, with an inexperienced roster with six freshmen and only four experienced returning players, Nevada went 12–19 in 2018–19.

In 2019–20, Nevada improved to 15–16. Then in 2020–21, with the season shortened due to the COVID-19 pandemic, Nevada finished 13–9, including a 9–7 record and fifth place finish in the Mountain West Conference standings, the best under Levens. Nevada improved further in 2021–22 with a 20–13 record, including 11–6 in Mountain West games for a third place tie in conference standings, and an appearance in the 2022 Women's Basketball Invitational third place game.

However, the 2022–23 Nevada team had just half as many wins at 10–21, finishing eighth in the Mountain West standings at 6–12 in conference play.

Personal life

In 2015, Levens adopted two boys, aged four and three at the time. Levens married Ashley Elliott, an assistant coach on her staff, in 2019.

Head coaching record

References

1979 births
Living people
American women's basketball coaches
American women's basketball players
Arizona State Sun Devils women's basketball coaches
Arizona State Sun Devils women's basketball players
Basketball coaches from Illinois
Basketball players from Illinois
Nevada Wolf Pack women's basketball coaches
Old Dominion Monarchs women's basketball players
People from Belvidere, Illinois
SIU Edwardsville Cougars women's basketball coaches
Guards (basketball)
Lesbian sportswomen
American LGBT sportspeople
LGBT basketball players
21st-century LGBT people